Teddy Ruxpin is an animatronic children's toy in the form of a talking 'Illiop', a creature which looks like a bear. The toy's mouth and eyes move while he reenacts  stories played on an audio tape cassette deck built into its back. While the character itself was created by Ken Forsse, the talking toy was designed and built by Forsse’s Alchemy II, Inc. employees, including Larry Larsen and John Davies. Later versions have a digital cartridge in place of a cassette. 

At the peak of its popularity, Teddy Ruxpin became the best-selling toy of 1985 and 1986. The 2006 version was awarded the 2006 Animated Interactive Plush Toy of the Year award by Creative Child Magazine. A cartoon based on the characters debuted in 1986. Teddy's extreme popularity in 1986 buoyed the controversial launch of the Nintendo Entertainment System, also distributed by Worlds of Wonder.

Technology
Conventional cassette tapes carry two audio tracks for stereo sound reproduction. Teddy Ruxpin cassettes use the left track for audio and the right track for a control data stream. The data stream controls servomotors that move the eyes and mouth and can divert the audio signal to Grubby, the companion toy, by means of a proprietary cable. This allows the two to engage in pre-recorded interactions. Grubby only works with the original WoW version of Teddy Ruxpin.

If a conventional audio cassette is played in either the second or third generation models of the original Teddy Ruxpin, this is detected and its right audio track is ignored and Teddy will not move. The production eject mechanism was design by global design firm RKS Design. Early versions of the toy use three servo motors, but this was reduced to two and even one in later versions.

History 
After the September 1985 debut, various toy makers have produced Teddy Ruxpin over the years. The first was Worlds of Wonder from 1985 until its bankruptcy in 1988. The cut rights were then sold to Hasbro, and produced again from 1991 to 1996. Another version debuted in 1998 by Yes! Entertainment, and another version in 2006 by BackPack Toys, owned and operated by Robert Taylor. The most recent version was produced by Wicked Cool Toys.

Shortly after his debut, Teddy Ruxpin was dubbed the "Official Spokesbear for the National Center for Missing and Exploited Children" in 1985.

Worlds of Wonder

Teddy Ruxpin was launched in 1985 by toy manufacturer Worlds of Wonder. Then came the companion toy Grubby, different outfits for Teddy and Grubby, and several other non-animatronic companion toys and characters. This includes two different versions of the bird-like Fobs (one orange, one purple) that are hand puppets with a sock-like, extendable neck. Other hand puppets are the larger Wooly What's-It, three interchangeable Anythings (This, That, The Other), Tweeg, and L.B. The Bounder. 

Other items produced by Worlds of Wonder for Teddy Ruxpin are the Answer Box and Picture Show. Actress Joanna Kerns served as Teddy's spokesperson shortly after its introduction, while at the height of her fame as Maggie Seaver on the ABC-TV sitcom Growing Pains.

Teddy Ruxpin sales peaked in 1986. Worlds of Wonder launched a series of safety messages for children, with different partners including firefighters and the United States Lifesaving Association. WoW became the exclusive distributor for the launch of the smash hit Nintendo Entertainment System, based on leveraging the undeniable strength of Teddy Ruxpin and Lazer Tag.

To retailers who were bitterly adamant against hearing the words "video game" after having survived the video game crash of 1983, WoW salesman Jim Whims distinctly recalled delivering an ultimatum: "If you want to sell Teddy Ruxpin and you want to sell Lazer Tag, you're gonna sell Nintendo as well. And if you feel that strongly about it, then you ought to just resign the line now." Historian Steven Kent wrote: "Anyone who wanted to sell Teddy Ruxpin and Lazer Tag, including Sears and Toys R Us, was going to hear about the Nintendo Entertainment System." WoW received windfall sales commissions from selling the NES, and $800 million in back orders for the Christmas season, mainly for Teddy Ruxpin and Lazer Tag.

In 1987, Worlds of Wonder contracted with Wendy's restaurants to feature a Teddy Ruxpin themed Kid's Meal promotion. These are similar to the miniatures produced by Worlds of Wonder, except they are smaller and flocked. Teddy Ruxpin characters joined the Ice Capades program, which toured the country.

In 1987 management staff of Worlds of Wonder grossly overestimated the popularity and inventory requirements of Teddy Ruxpin, which was actually in declining demand and was dwarfed by the NES. The excessive parts orders for making Teddy Ruxpin overextended the company's assets, and the situation was worsened when stock trades by company officers spooked investors.

In response to devaluation, WoW issued Non-Investment Grade Bonds, commonly known as junk bonds, in an effort to buoy itself. Although there is some contention as to whether this strategy would have helped, the attempt was made moot by the 1987 stock market crash. Worlds of Wonder filed for bankruptcy protection and was liquidated in 1988. They went through a series of layoffs. The creditors continued to operate the company in receivership until finally closing in late 1990. By 1991, Worlds of Wonder had closed and the remaining assets were liquidated.

Playskool
In 1991, the Teddy Ruxpin toy line was bought by Hasbro, which produced him under their Playskool line until 1996 using the redesign that had been implemented by WoW. This design is smaller and uses cartridges that resemble 8-track tapes, instead of cassette tapes.

Yes! Entertainment
In 1998, Yes! Entertainment brought Teddy Ruxpin back to stores for a third time. The toy's size is largely the same as the Playskool version. Yes! returned to using the standard cassette tapes. This venture was short-lived, however, as Yes! Entertainment's corporate management and financial troubles ultimately resulted in AlchemyII withdrawing the licensing for Teddy.

During this production of Teddy Ruxpin, an "interactive video" model was released under the branding "TV Teddy". The TV Teddy system consists of a series of specially encoded VHS cassettes, an RF-transmitter that relays signals encoded on the video track to the animatronic toy, and an animatronic RF-receiver consisting of a loudspeaker, and two servos which provide much-simplified eye and mouth movements compared to both the WoW and Playskool versions. 

The VHS cassettes consist of original opening content specifically designed for Teddy to interact with, followed by previously-released Hi-Topps videos which are encoded with additional content for the animatronic toy. A small Beanie Baby version of the toy is boxed with the Yes! Teddy Ruxpin based on the popularity of Beanie Babies at the time.

BackPack Toys
In 2005, BackPack Toys announced a fourth version of Teddy Ruxpin, which replaced the audio tapes with digital ROM cartridges.

Wicked Cool Toys
Wicked Cool Toys began the production of a new Teddy Ruxpin in late 2017. This Teddy Ruxpin does not come with physical cartridges, instead being programmed with 3 stories inside of the toy. The rest of the stories are available for purchase on a mobile app.

In May 2018, Alchemy and The Jim Henson Company made a deal to make a new Teddy Ruxpin series, animated as digital puppetry, aimed at preschoolers.

Book and cassette episode list

Worlds of Wonder
Worlds of Wonder produced the largest number of stories:

Other
Worlds of Wonder created two devices that work only with Teddy Ruxpin: the Picture Show and Answer Box. Neither of these work with Grubby. The Picture Show cassettes use slide wheels, similar to the View Master:
Big Little Wooly
Gimmick Learns A Lesson
The Great Grundo Groundrace
Teddy & The Surf Grunges
Teddy's Underwater Rescue
Tweeg's Lemonade Stand
Wedding In Grundo

The Answer Box cassettes are these:
Color My World
Counting is Fun
Easy as ABC
Just About The Size Of It
Learn About Opposites
Shapes are Everywhere
Up, Down and All Around

Book and cartridge episode list

Voice actors
Phil Baron was the voice actor on all tapes and on the TV show The Adventures of Teddy Ruxpin. He left the entertainment industry in the 1990s to become a cantor. Baron is currently the only voice actor officially associated with the property, as Teddy Ruxpin has been the only character in the storyline requiring updated voice recordings for new projects. The late Will Ryan voiced Grubby in the 1980s and returned as Grubby in the early 1990s for a musical project.

The late Tony Pope was the original voice of Newton Gimmick. He and other AlchemyII voice actors in the 1980s did not reprise their roles in the television series because production was moved to Canada, starring John Stocker as Gimmick. Baron and Ryan have provided the voices of Teddy and Grubby, respectively, in every project from 1985 up until Ryan's death in 2021. 

Ryan voiced the character of Tweeg in the adventure series. John Koensgen voiced Tweeg for the television series. Russi Taylor and Katie Leigh did the voices of Leota the Woodsprite and Princess Aruzia, respectively, on the book-and-tapes. When the TV series was produced in Canada, Holly Larocque and Abby Hagyard took over the roles.

The Adventures of Teddy Ruxpin

The Adventures of Teddy Ruxpin is a television series that ran from 1986 to 1987. In it, Teddy Ruxpin leaves his homeland in Rillonia with his friend Grubby in search of adventure. They meet an inventor named Newton Gimmick, who accompanies them on their quest for the Treasure of Grundo. The trio unexpectedly find six crystals with different meanings and powers. These crystals enable the Monsters and Villains Organization (MAVO) to have absolute power over the land. 

Their leader, Quellor, wants to make sure that an Illiop never possesses the crystals. Elsewhere, a less pronounced threat routinely besieges the trio: the wannabe villain Jack W. Tweeg, a greedy troll intending to join MAVO. The sixty-five episode series unfolds gradually, as the trio meet interesting and often friendly creatures while visiting intriguing lands and going on wondrous adventures.

Unofficial tape injunction
At least two other companies (Vector Intercontinental and Veritel Learning Systems) produced tapes that work with the Teddy Ruxpin toy. Worlds of Wonder successfully sued them in 1986, claiming the effect these tapes had on Teddy were too similar to the results of playing the proprietary recordings, and the courts in Ohio and Texas ordered the infringing tapes off the market.

In popular culture

Brigsby Bear, a 2017 American film, featured an animatronic bear suit, similar to the one in the animatronic pilot for the Adventures of Teddy Ruxpin. In the plot of the film, the suit is used in the production of a children's television series. The suit's mouth and eyes move when it plays a tape, just like the original toy. It is shown accepting both compact cassette and VHS tapes, both technologies that the toy utilized.

The 2019 comedy-horror film Camp Wedding featured a possessed Teddy Ruxpin toy as a central plot point. The prop was an authentic Teddy Ruxpin toy, modified to speak the lines, as well as to hide its logo. The toy is visible at the top of the film's poster.

See also
 AG Bear

References

External links
Grundo Gazette
The UNofficial Teddy Ruxpin Frequently Asked Questions website
Teddy Ruxpin Hospital and Adoption Centre

1980s toys
1990s toys
Animatronic robots
Mascots introduced in 1985
Hasbro products
Products introduced in 1985
Fictional teddy bears
Books about bears
Bear mascots
Toy brands
Toy mascots
Male characters in television
Male characters in advertising
Worlds of Wonder (toy company) products
Teenage characters in television
Electronic toys